Sofi Ahmed Chowdhury is a retired two-star rank Bangladesh Army officer and former Director General of Bangladesh Rifles.

Career
Chowdhury was the General Officer Commanding of the 33 Infantry division of Bangladesh Army. He was the Martial Law Administrator of Comilla region. He served as the Director General of Bangladesh rifles from 1 July 1988 to 23 Sep 1990.

References

Living people
Bangladesh Army generals
Director Generals of Border Guards Bangladesh
Year of birth missing (living people)